Phloeomys, the slender-tailed cloud rats, is a genus of large rodents in the family Muridae. Both species in this genus are endemic to the island of Luzon in the Philippines. Although their tail is covered by hairs, it is considerably less dense and shorter than in the rarer bushy-tailed cloud rats (genus Crateromys) that also inhabit the Philippines.

Species
Phloeomys contains two species, but the taxonomic limits between them are not fully resolved.

 Southern Luzon giant (or slender-tailed) cloud rat (Phloeomys cumingi)
 Northern Luzon giant (or slender-tailed) cloud rat (Phloeomys pallidus)

See also
Cloud rat

References

 
Rodents of the Philippines
Rodent genera
Taxa named by George Robert Waterhouse
Taxonomy articles created by Polbot
Endemic fauna of the Philippines